The Carnival of Vinaròs is an annual festival in Vinaròs, Spain that is held forty days before Lent. In 2007, it was renamed the Valencian Community's Tourist Interest Festivity and it aspires to be Spain's Tourist Interest Festivity. In 2016, it took place from 29 January to 8 February. This event usually takes place between January, February or March. There are 33 troupes, the largest of which comprises 500 people. Each troupe is represented by a queen who creates a spectacular costume.

History 
According to the documents of Municipal Archive the origin of the Carnival of Vinaròs which dates back to 1871. A masked dance was held in which fifty reales were collected and presented to the Mayor President of the City Council, Demetrio Ayguals de Izco by Nicolás Bas Rodríguez as charity. There are indications of the spontaneous celebration of the carnival during the times of the second Spanish republic and in 1939 the festivity was banned.

Comparsas 

Carnival of Vinaròs' ancient troupes:
 Karting
 Sortim perquè volem
 Jalem y alkatre
 Al lío montepío
 Penya Madrid
 Si no t'agrada no mires
 La casa d'Andalusia
 Me Río de Janeiro
 Los Bituneros
 Ni Pic ni Casso

Calendar

1st day (Friday): in the Town Hall, Carnival starts by a performance decorated with the Carnival's topic (In 2016 "The Circus") and the "Carnestoltes" presentation ("Carnestoltes" is a huge man made of a wood structure and dressed by a costume suitable with the Carnival's topic). Then, the Mayor and the queens open the Carnival's hutts enclosure (Placed in the Fóra Forat Walk where all nights parties take place in, each troupe has a hut where you can go into free and enjoy night parties).

2nd day (Saturday): The Queen's Presentation, where they show their fantastic costumes to all the people (Until this day, no-one knows how queen's costumes will be like). It's located on the old football pitch (Boverals H street / Football pitch street. It's placed in front of the river).

3rd day (Sunday): Flour's battle and Disguised pets Competition in the Carnival's hutts enclosure (Fóra Forat Walk), placed in the Fóra Forat Walk both.

4th day (Monday): Ederlies' dinner.

5th day (Tuesday): troupes fight for be the winner in a Karaoke Contest.

6th day (Wednesday): people dress up with thematic costumes that are suitable with the Carnival's Topic and enjoy the night in the Carnival's hutts enclosure (Fóra Forat Walk).

7th day (Thursday): all people dress up with pyjamas and enjoy the night in the Carnival's hutts enclosure (Fóra Forat Walk)

8th day (Friday): people dress in costumes (There are people who, instead of buying a normal costume, design, make and sew their own one) and enjoy the night in the Carnival's hutts enclosure (Fóra Forat Walk).

9th day (Saturday) and 10th day (Sunday): on Saturday (7 p.m.) and Sunday (6 p.m.), troupes parade around the main streets in a closed route (Calle Pilar, Calle Pablo Ruiz Picaso, Calle San Francisco, Calle País Valencià, Calle Arcipreste Bono, Plaza 1º de Mayo, Calle Costa y Borrás, Calle País Valencià, Calle Arcipreste Bono, Calle Socorro, Plaza Jovellar y Calle Pilar).

11th day (Monday): Carnival ends on the Town Hall and then the "Carnestoltes" is burned on the beach or on waste ground.

Moreover, in August there's the Summer Carnival with The Queen's Presentation to show the tourists what Carnival is like in Vinaròs.

References 

Carnivals in Spain
Festivals in Spain
Winter events in Spain